The Heart of Broadway is a 1928 American silent melodrama film directed by Duke Worne and starring Pauline Garon. It was produced by Worne and distributed by Rayart Pictures.

Cast
Pauline Garon as Roberta Clemmons
Robert Agnew as Billy Winters (credited as Bobby Agnew)
Wheeler Oakman as 'Dandy Jim' Doyle
Oscar Apfel as Dave Richards
Duke R. Lee as Duke Lee

Survival

The film is preserved at Bois d'Arcy in France and the Library of Congress.

References

External links

1928 films
American silent feature films
Films directed by Duke Worne
1928 drama films
Silent American drama films
American black-and-white films
Rayart Pictures films
1920s American films